Sandun Wijemanne Nissanka (born 6 May 1998) is a Sri Lankan-American record industry executive, label executive and entrepreneur. He is the CEO and founder of Serandip Music Group, Serandip Records, Serandip Publishing, and Bonfire Distribution, which is Sri Lanka’s first music distribution company. Apart from that, he also engaged in many international organizations such as Bonfire Global LLC, Ceylon X Corporation, B2B Services Inc., Serandip Music Group LLC, and Suavity Supplements LLC.

Personal life
He was born on 6 May 1998 in Colombo, Sri Lanka. He is a past pupil of Ananda College. During his school days, he excelled in sports and scouts. After moving to the USA, he graduated from California State University, Harvard Business School Online, and New York University Music Business Program. He is currently based in Orange County, California, USA.

Career
Nissanka established the Bonfire Distribution in 2018.  Later, the company became the first exclusive music distribution platform in Sri Lanka. He worked with musicians such as Yohani, Chamath Sangeeth, Shan Putha, DJ Mass, rapper Drillteam, and Stigmata. The song of Satheeshan’s cover Manike Mage Hithe by Chamath Sangeeth, Yohani was distributed by Bonfire.

Nissanka co-founded the artist management and music publishing company Serandip Records with Prathap Costa. In 2020, he founded another music company called "Serandip Music Group".

In October 2021, Nissanka expanded his Bonfire company and made its first U.S. partnership, with music technology platform Vydia. As a philanthropist, he made charity works and helped families by providing them with essential needs during Sri Lanka's COVID-19 pandemic. He is the CEO of the IT company Ceylon X.

Awards and accolades
He has won the President’s Education Award.

References

Sri Lankan businesspeople
1998 births
Living people
Sri Lankan business executives
American people of Sri Lankan descent